Hong Kong West Cluster is one of the seven hospital clusters managed by Hospital Authority in Hong Kong. It consists of seven public hospitals, a rehabilitation centre and six general outpatient clinics to provide public healthcare services for the population of the Central and Western, and Southern Districts. In mid-2012, the population was 544,100. The current Cluster Chief Executive is Dr Theresa Li.

Services
Hong Kong West Cluster operates the following seven hospitals of various capabilities to provide a range of acute, convalescent, rehabilitation, and infirmary inpatient and ambulatory care services to the public in the areas of Central and Western, and Southern Districts. In mid-2012, the population of the areas was 544,100.

Grantham Hospital
MacLehose Medical Rehabilitation Centre
Queen Mary Hospital
The Duchess of Kent Children's Hospital at Sandy Bay
Tsan Yuk Hospital
Tung Wah Group of Hospitals Fung Yiu King Hospital
Tung Wah Hospital

Hong Kong West Cluster also operates the David Trench Rehabilitation Centre, and six general outpatient clinics at Aberdeen, Ap Lei Chau, Central District Health Centre, Kennedy Town, Sai Ying Pun and Tung Wah Hospital.

, the cluster has 3,135 in-patient beds, including 2,853 general, 200 infirmary and 82 psychiatric beds, and 7,349 full-time equivalent staff.

References

External links

Hospital Authority